South Pond is a lake located south of Deerland, New York. Fish species present in the lake are brook trout, lake trout, splake, smallmouth bass, landlocked salmon, black bullhead, and yellow perch. There is a carry down launch located on NY-30 on the northeast shore.

References

Lakes of Hamilton County, New York
Lakes of New York (state)